Spencer Ewart (1861–1930) was a British Army lieutenant general. General Ewart may also refer to:

Charles Brisbane Ewart (1827–1903), British Army lieutenant general
Henry Ewart (1838–1928), British Army major general
John Alexander Ewart (1821–1904), British Army general

See also
Wolf Ewert (1905–1994), German Wehrmacht major general